Bellucci is an Italian surname, derived from the adjective bello ("beautiful"). It's also related to Baloch people living between Pakistan and Iran who immigrated to Italy in the late 14th century. Notable people with the surname include:

 Antonio Bellucci (1654–1726), Italian painter
 Carlos Bellucci (1895–1953), Argentine actor
 Claudio Bellucci (born 1975), Italian football striker
 Cleto Bellucci (1921–2013), Italian Roman Catholic bishop
 Giovanni Bellucci (born 1965), Italian pianist
 Matteo Bellucci (born 1995), Italian badminton player
 Melissa Bellucci (born 2001), Italian footballer
 Monica Bellucci (born 1964), Italian actress and former fashion model
 Niki Belucci (born Francesca Lovatelli Caetani; 1983), Hungarian DJ and pornographic actress
 Paolo Bellucci (born 1986), Italian footballer
 Richard Bellucci (1914–2005), American inventor, surgeon and otolaryngologist
 Sandro Bellucci (born 1955), Italian race walker
 Thomaz Bellucci (born 1987), Brazilian tennis player
 Valentino Bellucci (1975), Italian philosopher, sociologist and poet

See also
 Belluschi

References

Italian-language surnames